is a Japanese actor, comedian, singer, and director from Kanazawa-ku, Yokohama, Kanagawa Prefecture, affiliated with From First Production. He is married to idol singer and actress Midori Kinouchi. He is also known as the voice of Samuel L. Jackson in the dubbed version of the Avengers, as Nicholas "Nick" Fury.

Filmography

Film
Director
Munō no Hito (1991)
119 (1994)
Tōkyō Biyori (1997)
Rendan (2001)
Sayonara Color (2005)
Yamagata Scream (2009)
Downfall (2023)

Actor

Gonza the Spearman (1986)
Fancy Dance (1989)
Best Guy (1990)
Chizuko's Younger Sister (1991)
Hiruko the Goblin (1991)
Until the end of the World (1991)
Sumo Do, Sumo Don't (1992)
Like a Rolling Stone (1994)
Rampo (1994)
Tokyo Fist (1995)
Gonin (1995)
East Meets West (1995)
Shall We Dance? (1996) – Tomio Aoki
By Player (2000) – Taiji Tonoyama
Agitator (2001)
Waterboys (2001)
The Happiness of the Katakuris (2001)
Ping Pong (2002)
Azumi (2003)
Swing Girls (2004) – Tadahiko Ozawa
Sayonara Color (2005)
Midnight Sun (2006)
The School of Water Business (2006)
Catch a Wave (2006)
26 Years Diary (2007)
Kurosagi (2008)
My Girlfriend is a Cyborg (2008)
Tokyo! (2008)
Hana Yori Dango Final (2008)
4 Shimai Tantei Dan (2008)
Shinjuku Incident (2009)
On Next Sunday (2009)
Mutant Girls Squad (2010)
Hara-Kiri: Death of a Samurai (2011)
Karate-Robo Zaborgar (2011)
Hello, My Dolly Girlfriend (2013)
Lady Maiko (2014)
The Big Bee (2015)
Gonin Saga (2015)
125 Years Memory (2015) – Kudo
Gold Medal Man (2016)
Manhunt (2017)
Color Me True (2018)
Reon (2018)
Out and Out (2018)
Talking the Pictures (2019)
Fly Me to the Saitama (2019), the governor of Kanagawa Prefecture
Toshimaen (2019)
Samurai Marathon (2019)
Life on the Longboard: 2nd Wave (2019)
Enter the Fat Dragon (2020)
Dosukoi! Sukehira (2019)
Not Quite Dead Yet (2020)
The Grapes of Joy (2021)
The Blue Danube (2021)
Your Turn to Kill: The Movie (2021)
The Way of the Househusband (2022) – Kikujirō Eguchi
The Broken Commandment (2022)
Maku wo Orosuna! (2023) – Matsuo Bashō

Television
Hideyoshi (1996) – Toyotomi Hideyoshi
Harlock Saga (1999) - Harlock
100 Tales Of Horror (2003)
Good Luck!! (2003)
Nodame Cantabile (2006) – Franz von Stresemann
Teki wa Honnoji ni Ari (2007) – Hashiba Hideyoshi
Kami no Shizuku (2009) – Doi Robert
Saka no Ue no Kumo (2009–11) – Komura Jutarō
Garo: Makai Senki (2011) (Episode 1) – Eiichi Anan/Cigarein
Gunshi Kanbei (2014) – Toyotomi Hideyoshi
Kamen Rider Ghost (2015) – Hermit, Edith
Natsume Sōseki no Tsuma (2016)
Saigo no Restaurant (2016) – Oda Nobunaga
Byplayers (2017) – himself
Samurai Gourmet (2017) – Takeshi Kasumi
Totto-chan! (2017) – Sōsaku Kobayashi
Chichi, Nobunaga (2017) – Oda Nobunaga
Your Turn to Kill (2019)
The Way of the Househusband (2020) – Kikujirō Eguchi
Koeharu! (2021) – Enjō Kinakuji
Reach Beyond the Blue Sky (2021) – Tokugawa Nariaki
Okehazama (2021) – Hotta Dōkū

Television animation
One Piece (2009) – Shiki the Golden Lion
D4DJ First Mix (2020) – Dennojō Inuyose
Digimon Ghost Game (2021) – Ghost Navigator

Theatrical animation
Patlabor 2: The Movie (1993) – Shigeki Arakawa
Pocket Monsters the Movie: Emperor of the Crystal Tower ENTEI (2000) – Entei, Doctor Shurī (Dr Spencer Hale in the dub)
Ghost in the Shell 2: Innocence (2004) – Kimu
Sword of the Stranger (2007) – Kachū
The Sky Crawlers (2008) – Master
One Piece Film: Strong World (2009) – Shiki the Golden Lion
Penguin Highway (2018) – Hamamoto's Father
One Piece: Stampede (2019)
Over the Sky (2020) – Mogari

Video games
Binary Domain (PlayStation 3, Sega, 2012) – Yoji Amada
Ryū ga Gotoku Kenzan! (PlayStation 3, Sega, 2008) – Nagayoshi Marume
Haunting Ground (PlayStation 2, Capcom, 2005) – Cinematics director
Nioh 2 (2020) – Tōkichirō

Dubbing roles

Live-action
Batman Forever (1995) – Bruce Wayne/Batman (Val Kilmer)
Batman & Robin (1997) – Bruce Wayne/Batman (George Clooney)
The Avengers (2012) – Nick Fury (Samuel L. Jackson)
Captain America: The Winter Soldier (2014) – Nick Fury (Samuel L. Jackson)
Avengers: Age of Ultron (2015) – Nick Fury (Samuel L. Jackson)
Avengers: Infinity War (2018) – Nick Fury (Samuel L. Jackson)
Captain Marvel (2019) – Nick Fury (Samuel L. Jackson)
Spider-Man: Far From Home (2019) – Nick Fury (Samuel L. Jackson)

Animation
Postman Pat (1994) – Narrator and all voices
The Hunchback of Notre Dame II (2002) – Sarousch
Ice Age (2002) – Diego
Shrek 2 (2004) – Puss in Boots
Ice Age: The Meltdown (2006) – Diego
Shrek the Third (2008) – Puss in Boots
Ice Age: Dawn of the Dinosaurs (2009) – Diego
Shrek Forever After (2011) – Puss in Boots
Puss in Boots (2011) – Puss in Boots

Discography

Singles
"Wrestler" (1984)
"Postman Pat no Uta" (1994)
"Dokutoku-kun" (1995)
"Deka Melon" (1997)
"Kimi ni Hoshi ga Furu" (1997)
"Nichiyōbino Shokuji" (1998)

Albums
Kawatta Katachi no Ishi (1984)
Naoto Takenaka no Kimi to Itsumademo (1995)
Merci Boku (1995)
Merci Boku, Unpeu Boku ~ Live in Japan (1995)
Eraserhead (1996)
Kuchibue to Ukulele (2000)

Other appearances
Demento (PlayStation 2, Capcom, 2005) – Cinematics director, motion actor (Riccardo)

Film awards
1991
Blue Ribbon Awards Best Actor (Munō no Hito)
Hochi Film Award Rookie of the Year (Munō no Hito)
Venice Film Festival FIPRESCI Prize (Munō no Hito)
1992
Japan Academy Prize Best Supporting Actor (Shiko Funjatta)
1995
Japan Academy Prize Best Supporting Actor (East Meets West)
1996
Japan Academy Prize Best Supporting Actor (Shall We Dance?)

References

External links
 

1956 births
Japanese male film actors
Japanese male television actors
Japanese male video game actors
Japanese male voice actors
Japanese male comedians
Japanese film directors
Japanese impressionists (entertainers)
Living people
People from Yokohama
Musicians from Kanagawa Prefecture
Taiga drama lead actors
Tama Art University alumni
20th-century Japanese male actors
20th-century Japanese male singers
20th-century Japanese singers
21st-century Japanese male actors
21st-century Japanese male singers
21st-century Japanese singers